Fairphone 4 is a smartphone designed and marketed by Fairphone. It succeeds the Fairphone 3+. It was announced on September 30, 2021, and available for order from October 25, 2021.

Major upgrades from the predecessor include bigger display, better camera with optical image stabilization, improved selfie camera, 5G support, IP54 dust and splash protection and MIL810G certification, USB-C port, bigger battery, 20W fast charging among other changes.

It comes with Android 11 “Red Velvet Cake” with promised 2 major Android updates (Android 12 “Snow Cone” and Android 13 “Tiramisu”) and up to 5 years of warranty.

Materials 
The Fairphone 4 is made with Fairtrade-certified gold, aluminium from Aluminium Stewardship Initiative (ASI) Performance Standard certified vendors, fair tungsten from Rwanda, recycled tin, rare earth minerals and plastics.

Modular design

The phone's modular design—it is constructed out of seven modules—makes it easier to repair than most smartphones. The rear of the phone can be removed without using tools. Having removed the rear, the battery can be lifted out and replaced. Using a regular Phillips #00 screwdriver, the display is easily removed and the modules are held in using only press fit sockets.

Operating systems 
CalyxOS 4.2.7, Android 13 is available for the Fairphone 4, as of December 2022. In April 2022, CalyxOS provided "test builds" of Android 12L. /e/ supports Fairphone 4, but Ron Amadeo at Ars Technica in April 2020 warned, "they'll most likely be on an old version of Android".

Reception 
The Fairphone 4 received mostly positive reviews praising its guarantee of software support until 2025 and up to 5 years of warranty as well as improvements over its predecessor. However, the lack of a headphone jack was criticized along with the occasional sluggish performance and the quality of the camera and fingerprint sensor.

See also

 Fairphone 1
 Fairphone 2
 Fairphone 3
 Fairphone 3+

References 

Fair trade brands
Modular smartphones
Android (operating system) devices
Mobile phones introduced in 2021
Mobile phones with user-replaceable battery
Smartphones